Magnus Dahl (born 28 September 1988) is a Norwegian handball player for Skjern Håndbold and the Norwegian national team.

References

1988 births
Living people
Norwegian male handball players
Norwegian expatriate sportspeople in Spain
Handball players from Oslo
IFK Kristianstad players